Bryan J. Baptiste (October 15, 1955 – June 22, 2008) was an American politician and member of the Republican Party.  He served as mayor of the County of Kauai in Hawaii from 2002 until his death.

Early life 
Baptiste was born in Lihue, Kauai. Baptiste was a descendant of Portuguese immigrants who settled in Hawaii. He came from a family that has long been involved in politics on Kauai, including his father, who was chair of the former Kauai county board of supervisors, a position equivalent to mayor today.

Career 
In 1996, Baptiste, then manager of the Kaua'i War Memorial Convention Hall and head of an islandwide park beautification program, was elected to the Kaua'i County Council. Baptiste served as a member of the council for six years before running for mayor to succeed Republican Maryanne Kusaka, who was ineligible to run again due to term limits. In the 2002 mayoral election, Baptiste faced two fellow councilmembers, Democrats Ron Kouchi and Randal Valenciano. In the September primary election, Baptiste received 38% of the vote, Kouchi received 35%, and Valenciano won 21%, allowing Baptiste and Kouchi to advance to the runoff. In the runoff Baptiste defeated Kouchi, winning 12,174 votes to Kouchi's 10,517.

In 2006, Baptiste avoided a runoff by two votes (he needed fifty percent of the vote plus one vote to win), joking, "We had one vote more than we needed to win. That's the cushion."

Baptiste died while in office of a heart attack on June 22, 2008. He was succeeded by his former deputy, Bernard Carvalho, who won a special election to complete Baptiste's term.

Legacy 
Baptiste has since been memorialized with the Kapa'a New Town Park Facility renamed in his honor, following a million dollar upgrade of park facilities, including the installation of new lighting systems, locker rooms, and grass strips for the football field, improvements that Baptiste had long advocated for. He is survived by his wife Annette and their four children.

References 

1955 births
2008 deaths
Mayors of Kauai
Kauai County Council members
People from Kauai County, Hawaii
Hawaii people of Portuguese descent
Hawaii Republicans
20th-century American politicians
American people of Portuguese descent